Malcolm Taylor McAdam Harding (1863 – 1949) was a bishop of the Anglican Church of Canada in the 20th century.

Ordained in 1889, his first posts were curacies at Holy Trinity Merrickville, Ontario and St. George's Cathedral, Kingston, Ontario. After this he was  Rector of St. Matthew's Cathedral, Brandon, Manitoba then Archdeacon of Assiniboia. In 1909 he became Coadjutor Bishop of Qu’Appelle, and two years later its Diocesan. Elected Metropolitan of Rupert's Land and translated to the Diocese of Rupert's Land in 1935 he was then styled Archbishop of Rupert's Land. He retired in 1942. He died on 22 April 1949.

References
 

1864 births
1949 deaths
Anglican archdeacons in North America
Anglican bishops of Qu'Appelle
Anglican bishops of Rupert's Land
Metropolitans of Rupert's Land
20th-century Anglican Church of Canada bishops
20th-century Anglican archbishops